Shout God's Fame is the first live album of contemporary worship music from Hillsong London.

Making of the album
Shout God's Fame was recorded live at the Mermaid Conference and Events Centre in mid-2003 by the Hillsong London team.

Track listing
 "Shout Your Fame" (Jonas Myrin, Gio Galanti, Natasha Bedingfield, Paul Nevison) - 4:47
 "My God" (Marty Sampson) - 3:52
 "Gonna Be All Right" (Galanti, Myrin) - 5:59
 "You Are My Rock" (Galanti, Bedingfield) - 5:40
 "You're Here with Me" (Myrin) - 5:57
 "Centre of My Life" (Myrin, Bedingfield) - 6:31
 "I Will Go" (Myrin & Bedingfield) - 4:42
 "History Maker" (Martin Smith) - 5:53
 "Here I Am (Father's Love)" (Myrin, Bedingfield) - 6:05
 "For This Cause" (chorus only)/"Eagles Wings"/"Carry Me" ("For This Cause": Joel Houston; "Eagles Wings": Reuben Morgan; "Carry Me": Sampson) - 7:42
 "In You I Stand" (Nevison, Galanti) - 6:36
 "King of Majesty" (Sampson) - 7:06

References 

2004 live albums
Hillsong Music live albums